Ħajt il-Wied, is a zone in the north of Żejtun, Malta. Wied Mazza (Mazza Valley), separates Żejtun from Żabbar and Marsaskala.

Hunting is permitted in this area.

Climate 
The rainy water of Żejtun first goes to this valley, before it runs into the sea.  The southern part is known as "Ħajt il-Wied", meaning wall of the valley.

Architecture 
Many medieval buildings located here date to the Norman period.

References 

Populated places in Malta
Hajt il-Wied